Perceval Gibbon (4 November 1879 – 30 May 1926) was an author and journalist, serving for the Rand Daily Mail in South Africa, as well as for other publications. Gibbon had travelled to South Africa in 1898, moved to the war front and became the representative of a syndicate of colonial newspapers at the outbreak of the Anglo-Boer War. He is best remembered for his short stories, which often contained an ironic twist at the end. Gibbon's influence on the work of later South African authors has been acknowledged. For instance, the fictional narrator of Vrouw Grobelaar's Leading Cases (1905) is said to be a forerunner of Herman Charles Bosman's character Oom Schalk Lourens.

He was born in Trelech, Carmarthenshire, Wales, and was educated in the Moravian School, in Königsfeld of Baden, Germany. Gibbon worked as a merchant mariner, travelling in Europe, Africa, and the Americas. Perceval Gibbon was a friend of the writer Joseph Conrad, and dedicated his novel Flower o' the Peach (1911) to Joseph Conrad and Jessie Conrad. Conrad dedicated his novel Victory (1915) to Perceval and Maisie Gibbon.

Gibbon's early works were influenced by his extensive travels throughout Europe, America, and Africa.

During World War I he was a war correspondent with the Italian Army from 1917 to 1918. In 1918–1919, Perceval Gibbon was a Major in the British Royal Marines.

In 2007 the work Margaret Harding was adapted into a screenplay by Meg Rickards who directed the mini-series and the made-for-TV feature film for SABC.

Selected works

 African Items, 1903 (verse)
 Souls in Bondage, 1904 (novel)
 Salvator, 1905 (novel)
 Vrouw Grobelaar's Leading Cases, 1905 (stories)
 Flower o' the Peach, 1911 (novel). (Published in Britain by Methuen, London under the title Margaret Harding).
 The Adventures of Miss Gregory, 1911 (stories)
 Margaret Harding, 1911 (novel), (published in the US by The Century Co, New York under the title Flower o' the Peach). adapted into television series, Land of Thirst in 2008.
 The Triumph of the Royal Navy: Official Record of the Surrender of the German Fleet, 1918, Hodder & Stoughton, 48pp.
 
 
 The Dark Places, 1926 (stories)

References

External links
 Perceval Gibbon Papers at the Harry Ransom Humanities Research Center
 Film based on "Margaret Harding"
 Film based on "Margaret Harding"
 
 
 Short Stories by Perceval Gibbon at manybooks.net
 1949 American radio play production of Gibbon's "The Second Class Passenger". Adapted from the 1913 short story.

1879 births
1926 deaths
Royal Marines officers